The WXW Women's Championship is the top women's professional wrestling title in the World Xtreme Wrestling promotion. It was created in 1996 as the WSWF Women's Championship under WXW's original name, the World Star Wrestling Federation. The promotion renamed to its current name in 1998. Currently, there have been 22 recognized known champions with a total of 32 title reigns.

Title history

Combined reigns

Footnotes

References 

Women's professional wrestling championships
World Xtreme Wrestling championships